Piccadilly Square is an open-air shopping area located in the Union Street Historic District in the Newton Centre village of Newton, Massachusetts.

References

Shopping malls established in 1973
Shopping malls in Massachusetts